Blackstone on Broadway is a 1977 historical thriller novel by the British writer Derek Lambert, published under the pen name Richard Falkirk. It is the final entry in a series of six novels featuring Edmund Blackstone, a member of the Bow Street Runners in the pre-Victorian era. Blackstone is assigned to assist the New York City police force, but has his own schemes to pursue while there.

References

Bibliography
 Bill Pronzini & Marcia Muller. 1001 Midnights: The Aficionado's Guide to Mystery and Detective Fiction. Arbor House, 1986.

1977 British novels
Novels by Derek Lambert 
British historical novels
British thriller novels
Novels set in London
Novels set in New York City
Novels set in the 1820s
Methuen Publishing books